Anthurium glaucophyllum is a species of plant in the family Araceae. It is endemic to Ecuador.  Its natural habitat is subtropical or tropical moist montane forests. It is threatened by habitat loss.

References

Endemic flora of Ecuador
glaucophyllum
Data deficient plants
Taxonomy articles created by Polbot